Bhopalgarh Assembly constituency is one of constituencies of Rajasthan Legislative Assembly in the Pali (Lok Sabha constituency). Senior Congress leaders like Paras Ram Maderna used to contest election from this seat Also during the first election in 1967 Ram Singh Bishnoi contested from this constituency.

List of members

References

See also
Member of the Legislative Assembly (India)

Jodhpur district
Assembly constituencies of Rajasthan